Henk Poppe (born 12 July 1952 in Nijverdal, Overijssel) was a Dutch professional road bicycle racer. Poppe won a stage in the 1974 Tour de France.

Major results

1969
 National Novice Road Race Championship
1971
Ronde van Limburg
1972
 National Militaries Road Race Championship
1974
Belsele
Tour de France:
Winner stage 2

References

External links 

Official Tour de France results for Henk Poppe

1952 births
Living people
People from Hellendoorn
Dutch male cyclists
Dutch Tour de France stage winners
Cyclists from Overijssel